Abahani Limited may refer to:

Abahani Limited Dhaka, sports club in Dhaka, Bangladesh
Abahani Limited (Chittagong), sports club in Chittagong, Bangladesh
Abahani Limited cricket team, List A cricket team in Bangladesh